Karwari Catholics (Konkani: Karwarchem Katholik) are Indian Christians following the Roman Rite, hailing primarily from the Karwar township and the surrounding North Kanara district, situated on the Kanara coast of Karnataka state, India. They are Konkani people and speak the Karwari dialect of the Konkani language. Colloquially called "Karwar district", this region falls under the jurisdiction of the Roman Catholic Diocese of Karwar. At the turn of the new century, the diocese had about 50,000 Catholics, comprising 3% of the total population of the district.

Citations

External links

 UCAN

Indian Roman Catholics
Ethnicities of Karnataka
Konkani
Karnataka society
Christian communities of India
Social groups of Karnataka
Social groups of Goa
Ethnic groups in India